Mario Allegretti (Vignola, 6 September 1919 – Saltino, 10 April 1945) was an Italian soldier and Resistance leader during World War II.

Biography

He was born in Vignola, province of Modena, on 6 September 1919, the son of Antonio Allegretti and Rosa Vedovelli, and after graduating in law from the University of Modena, in December 1941, he was called up for service in the Royal Italian Army during the Royal Italian Army and assigned to the 33rd Tank Regiment, stationed in Parma, with the rank of second lieutenant, after attending an officer's course in Bologna. After the fall of Fascism, during the short rule of the Badoglio government, he joined the Action Party together with his brother Franco.

Following the proclamation of the armistice of Cassibile and the German occupation of Italy, he avoided capture by the Germans in Parma and started to organize the first Justice and Freedom partisan groups on Monte Santa Giulia, in the Modenese Apennines. He was arrested in June 1944 but released by the intervention of the CLN, reaching the partisan groups operating in the area of Montefiorino, Ospitaletto, Pianorso and Are Vecchie. Due to his courage he quickly rose in rank and was given command of the "Italia Libera" partisan group and from November 1944 that of the 34th Partisan Brigade "Monte Santa Giulia", part of the "Modena Montagna" Partisan Division. On 10 April 1945 he was killed in action while leading an attack on a German machine-gun post – after having already silenced another two – during the defense of Monte Santa Giulia. He was posthumously awarded the Gold Medal of Military Valor.

References

1919 births
1945 deaths
Italian military personnel of World War II
Italian military personnel killed in World War II
Recipients of the Gold Medal of Military Valor
Italian resistance movement members
Italian partisans
Military personnel killed in World War II

it:Mario Allegretti
ru:Аллегретти, Марио